Crosby Lake is an alpine freshwater lake located on a plateau at the northern skirt of Crosby Mountain, a short distance south of Red Mountain and Palmer Mountain in King County, Washington. Boner Lake is at the opposite side of the Crosby Mountain ridge. Crosby Lake is a small  lake and it is stocked with golden trout.

Location 
The summit of Crosby Mountain is approximately 1/4 mile south. Crosby Lake is less than a mile from Boner Lake, which sits in a plateau that is used as the trail to Crosby Mountain from the south approach. Cement Lake is a mile east from Crosby Lake.

See also 
 List of lakes of the Alpine Lakes Wilderness

References 

Lakes of King County, Washington
Lakes of the Alpine Lakes Wilderness
Okanogan National Forest